The Party of Labour of Catalonia was a communist party in Catalonia, Spain. PTC was formed in 1979 following a split from the Party of Labour of Spain (PTE). The leader of PTC was Joan Sánchez Carreté.

PTC soon merged with the Marxist Unification Movement (MUM) and formed the Catalan Workers Bloc (BCT). The group that remained in PTE also called itself PTC, and contested the 1979 parliamentary elections as "Partit del Treball de Catalunya (Federación del Partido del Trabajo de España)". In the 1980 Catalan regional election the party supported and participated in the electoral candidacy Unity for Socialism.

References

Defunct communist parties in Catalonia
1979 establishments in Spain
Political parties established in 1979
1980 disestablishments in Spain
Political parties disestablished in 1980